Nieporęt  is a village in Legionowo County, Masovian Voivodeship in east-central Poland. It is the seat of the gmina (administrative district) called Gmina Nieporęt.

The village has a population of 3,194 people.

References

Villages in Legionowo County